Caçarelhos e Angueira is a civil parish in the municipality of Vimioso, Portugal. It was formed in 2013 by the merger of the former parishes Caçarelhos and Angueira. The population in 2011 was 335, in an area of 53.16 km².

References

Freguesias of Vimioso